Yevgeni Glukhov may refer to:

 Yevgeni Glukhov (footballer, born 1974), Russian football player
 Yevgeni Glukhov (footballer, born 1976), Russian football player